Royal Excelsior Mouscron was a Belgian football club from the municipality of Mouscron, Hainaut. In December 2009 they were declared bankrupt and soon ceased to exist. A new club known as Royal Excel Mouscron was formed in March 2010 and placed in the Belgian Third Division.

History
The club was the result of the merger between Stade Mouscron and A.R.A. Mouscron in 1964.

R.E. Mouscron had financial problems during the 2004–05 season and so the president and mayor of Mouscron Jean-Pierre Detremmerie left the club and was replaced by Edward Van Daele.  The players with the higher wages were asked to leave the club, as did Marcin Żewłakow, Franky Vandendriessche, Geoffrey Claeys, Koen De Vleeschauwer and Alexandre Teklak.

In late 2009 Manchester City was ready to spend £3million to save R.E. Mouscron from bankruptcy and use them as a feeder club.

On 28 December 2009, Mouscron announced its third forfeit in a row because of enduring financial problems, and was thus, according to Belgian league rules, excluded from competition, with all its previous results in the ongoing competition being scrapped. The club in its current form ceased to exist, with all its players (and staff) becoming free agents.

In March 2010 a successor club was formed with the merging of the bankrupt R.E. Mouscron and R.R.C. Peruwelz. The new club is known as Royal Mouscron-Péruwelz.

Honours
Belgian Second Division:
Runners-up (1): 1993–94
Belgian Second Division Final Round:
Winners (1): 1996
Belgian Cup:
Runners-up (2): 2001–02, 2005–06

European record
As of December 2008.

Former coaches
1990–1995 : André Van Maldeghem
1995–1996 : Georges Leekens
1996–1997 : Georges Leekens, Gil Vandenbrouck
1997–2002 : Hugo Broos
2002–2003 : Lorenzo Staelens
2003–2004 : Georges Leekens
2004–2005 : Philippe Saint-Jean, Geert Broeckaert
2005–2006 : Geert Broeckaert, Paul Put, Gil Vandenbrouck
2006–2007 : Gil Vandenbrouck
2007–12/2008 : Marc Brys
12/2007-06/2009: Enzo Scifo

References

External links
 Official Website
 R.E. Mouscron at UEFA.COM
 R.E. Mouscron at EUFO.DE
 R.E. Mouscron at Weltfussball.de
 R.E. Mouscron at Football Squads.co.uk
 R.E. Mouscron at National Football Teams.com
 R.E. Mouscron at Football-Lineups.com

 
Defunct football clubs in Belgium
Association football clubs established in 1964
Association football clubs disestablished in 2009
1964 establishments in Belgium
2009 disestablishments in Belgium
Organisations based in Belgium with royal patronage
Sport in Mouscron
Belgian Pro League clubs